Eddie Tucker (born 24 June 1932) is  a former Australian rules footballer who played with Fitzroy in the Victorian Football League (VFL).

Notes

External links 
		

Living people
1932 births
Australian rules footballers from Victoria (Australia)
Fitzroy Football Club players